Nagrik is a 2015 Indian Marathi language mystery political film, directed by Jaypraad Desai and produced by Arti Sachin Chavan and co-produced by Dr.Sunil Chavan presented by Sachhi Entertainment and Ronak Bandelkar. The film is released on 12 June 2015.

Plot
Nagrik is set against the political backdrop of Maharashtra. Shyam Jagdale, the chief political correspondent of a leading Marathi daily called 'Aaj Mumbai' does an important exposé in his political column 'Nagrik'. This triggers off a series of events that uncovers the unholy nexus between politics, business and the media. Plans of Vikas Patil, the new rising star on the political horizon, are thwarted. Shyam becomes suspicious at the turn of events and smells a bigger conspiracy. But treading the path of truth has never been easy or forgiving.

Cast
 Dr Shriram Lagoo
 Dilip Prabhavalkar
 Sachin Khedekar
 Sulabha Deshpande 
  Neena Kulkarni
 Devika Daftardar
 Rajesh Sharma 
 Milind Soman
 Rajkumar Tangde

Critical response 
Ganesh Matkari of Pune Mirror wrote "Success, I believe, is not all that matters, sometimes it is enough to see that you have given it all you’ve got". Mihir Bhanage of The Times of India gave the film 3.5 stars out of 5 and wrote "We rarely see a film that has a strong balance of good content and technical acumen. Nagrik is one of those rare one. Do give it a watch".

References

External links
 

2010s Marathi-language films
2015 films
Indian mystery films
Indian drama films